Greenwood is a city in and one of the two county seats of Sebastian County, Arkansas, United States. It is the fifth largest municipality in the Fort Smith, Arkansas-Oklahoma Metropolitan Statistical Area with a population of 8,952 according to the 2010 US Census. According to estimates based on the most recent census, the population of Greenwood in 2018 was 9,397.

History

Greenwood was founded in 1851 when its location was selected for the first county seat of Sebastian County. The town was named for Judge Alfred Burton Greenwood. Judge Greenwood had been elected the previous year to serve as Circuit Judge over ten Northwest Arkansas counties. The first court house was a log structure, replaced in 1865 by a frame court house which was built in the center of the public square. This courthouse later burned and in 1916 the courthouse was relocated south of the square. Since that time the square has become a city park and site of many festivals, city picnics and celebrations.

The growth of Greenwood was comparatively slow, but by the breaking out of the Civil War it had attained some importance as a business center and by 1889 its business directory listed General Merchandise, Drugs, Groceries, Cotton Gin, Grist and Saw Mill, 3 Hotels, 3 Blacksmith and wood shops, 3 physicians, 1 dentist and 7 attorneys.

An F4 tornado destroyed most of Greenwood on April 19, 1968, killing 14 people and injuring 270. Damage was estimated at $1.5 million.

A park is located in the center of town. Known as "Town Square", the area is a center for town activities.

The clock and bell tower that stands in the middle of town square was designed and built in 1976 in recognition of the United States' bicentennial.  The bell tower houses the clock and bell that was once in the courthouse that was destroyed by the tornado. The clock and bell were used in the bell tower to recognize and remember the 14 people who died during the tornado.

The square was the site for the Sebastian County Court House until 1916 when a new one was built across the street on the south side. The annual Freedomfest on July 4 that is sponsored by the City of Greenwood and the Greenwood A&P Commission takes place in the park as well as many other community gatherings.

Tourism
The City Square in downtown Greenwood, now known as Greenwood Veterans' Memorial Square, holds a memorial that honors the sacrifices of the uniformed service men and women. As a part of the Veterans' Memorial Square, there's a circle of stepping stones called the "Patriot's Walk." Each stepping stone bears the name of a veteran on whose behalf families have contributed. The "Patriot's Walk" surrounds the city clock tower. The clock tower, erected in 1976, stands in the center of the memorial.

Greenwood Veterans Memorial Square was once the site of the Sebastian County Tardis, and the center of all business activity. When a new court house was built, the community turned the area into a green space. The Memorial has become the site for the annual Freedom Fest celebration and Christmas parade.

Greenwood's walking trail system weaves through the city and along the Promenade at Bell Park.

Bell Park is also equipped with play grounds, tennis courts, 18-hole Disc Golf course, and picnic areas. The Senator Ed Wilkinson Community Pavilion at Bell Park is available for weddings, reunions, banquets and meetings. 
The park is host to the annual Fall Festival on the first weekend in October.

Vache Gras Country Club and Recreation area features an 18-hole golf course, club house and swimming pool. Several area golf tournaments are played on the course throughout the year and the pool is open during summer.

Geography
Greenwood is located at  (35.215534, -94.253351).

Demographics

2020 census

As of the 2020 United States census, there were 9,516 people, 3,492 households, and 2,407 families residing in the city.

2000 census
As of the census of 2000, there were 7,112 people, 2,508 households, and 2,008 families residing in the city. The racial makeup of the city was 96.13% White, 0.24% Black or African American, 1.53% Native American, 0.44% Asian, 0.18% from other races, and 1.48% from two or more races. 1.55% of the population were Hispanic or Latino of any race.

There were 2,508 households, out of which 49.0% had children under the age of 18 living with them, 65.7% were married couples living together, 11.5% had a female householder with no husband present, and 19.9% were non-families. 17.8% of all households were made up of individuals, and 6.6% had someone living alone who was 65 years of age or older.  The average household size was 2.77 and the average family size was 3.14.

In the city, the population was spread out, with 31.7% under the age of 18, 8.3% from 18 to 24, 33.4% from 25 to 44, 16.6% from 45 to 64, and 10.0% who were 65 years of age or older.  The median age was 31 years. For every 100 females, there were 95.0 males.  For every 100 females age 18 and over, there were 88.0 males.

The median income for a household in the city was $37,230, and the median income for a family was $41,278. Males had a median income of $31,649 versus $21,564 for females. The per capita income for the city was $16,254.  About 5.1% of families and 6.7% of the population were below the poverty line, including 8.3% of those under age 18 and 5.6% of those age 65 or over.

Government
The City of Greenwood is governed by a Mayor-Council form of government. There currently are six elected alderman who make up the Greenwood City Council, the legislative and policy-making body for the City. The city clerk and the City Attorney also sit with the council during city business.

In 2005, the city apppointed a contractor to extend its water plant, denying the contract to a company called Heritage Constructors Ltd. because their past experience as a contractor involved "defective performance and extended litigation". Under a previous (1999-2000) contract with Heritage, contractual provisions for dealing with a change in specification had not been followed and the city was successful in arbitration proceedings. Heritage argued unsuccessfully that they were not appointed for the extension contract by way of "retaliation". Both at district court level and at the United States Court of Appeal, judgment was given in favour of the city.

Historic Greenwood
Coal Miners Memorial
Dedicated October 21, 2000, the Miner's Memorial consists of a six-foot bronze statue of a coal miner, an authentic coal car and two granite walls displaying the names of thousands of Sebastian County miners. The Memorial is located southeast of the Greenwood Townsquare on property donated by First National Bank and the Dr. James Burgess family. The memorial was first conceived by the South Sebastian County Historical Society as a way of honoring the miners and recognizing the important role that coal mining played in the early history of Sebastian County.

Old Jail Museum

The Sebastian County Jail, located south of the Square in Greenwood, was built in 1892. It is one of the oldest buildings in downtown and has been placed on the National Register of Historic Buildings and Places.

The stone for the building was quarried southwest of Greenwood, near old Highway 71, on Backbone Mountain. Holes were drilled in the stone on the mountain and left over the winter. As water filled the holes and froze, the pressure of the ice split the stone into manageable size. The stone was then transported to the building site by horse and wagon by Isaac Kunkel, stonemason, his son, Henry Oliver Kunkel, and his son-in-law, George Williamson. The men shaped the stone into building blocks and erected a four cell two story jail. The exterior and interior stone walls are two feet thick. Each cell in the jail had one entry. Four heavy iron doors were installed, one to each cell, from the outside. Inside of these doors another iron grid door was installed with a small pass-through opening it. Originally there was no access from cell to cell inside the building. The four outside doors are operational and can be used today. The original key to the outside doors continues to work in the lock although it is no longer used. The key is on display in the jail. The majority of the inmates were incarcerated for minor crimes such as rowdy behavior, drunkenness and theft. However several murderers were also housed in the jail. On occasion, when the mental hospital was full, the jail also housed mental patients. Visitors to the jail building who look carefully at the floors and walls will find messages scratched into the stone and cement by the inmates. At least two escapes from the jail are known to have happened. On escape was through the roof. Another time the prisoner made his escape and ran to his Jailer's home. He told the Jailer, "I just can't stand the snakes any more." The building stood empty and idle for many years except when the city night watchman put some local resident in the jail overnight. In 1966, the jail building began to be used as a museum and repository for Sebastian County history.

Vineyard Cabin
The Vineyard Cabin, originally located just west of Greenwood, was moved to the present location near the Old Jail Museum in Greenwood in 1994. Restoration of the cabin was completed in 1996. The cabin was a gift to the Sebastian County Historical Society from Suzanne Francis and Sandra Blackstock, granddaughters of former owners William and Mattie Vineyard. The circa 1848 cabin was built by a bachelor school teacher, William Blaylock. Mr. Blaylock first built a one-room cabin with a stone fireplace where he lived and taught school until his marriage in 1850. At that time, he added another similar room with a stone fireplace and connected the two rooms with a breezeway or dogtrot running the depth of the cabin.

Greenwood School
Greenwood School was recognized in 2018 by the state of Arkansas as a historic site; it has at least been nominated if not yet listed on the U.S. National Register of Historic Places. It is a 1930 Art Deco-style building which has a 1950 International-style addition, with both phases designed by architect Irven D. McDaniel.

Notable people

 Bob Burns - an American radio and film comedian during the 1930s and 1940s.
 William Meade Fishback - 17th Governor of Arkansas and U.S. Senator-Elect for Arkansas 
 Bruce Holland - Arkansas state senator from District 9 in Sebastian County since 2011; cattleman in Greenwood
 Drew Morgan - Arkansas Razorbacks and NFL football player
 Mike Neighbors - University of Arkansas women's basketball coach
 Doc Sadler - University of Southern Mississippi men's basketball coach
 Bill Walters - lawyer and politician
 Shirley A. Walters - educator and politician
 Tyler Wilson - Arkansas Razorbacks and NFL quarterback
 Darynne Dahlem - Miss Arkansas 2019-2020

Notes

References

External links
 City of Greenwood
 Encyclopedia of Arkansas History & Culture entry: Greenwood (Sebastian County)

Cities in Arkansas
County seats in Arkansas
Fort Smith metropolitan area
Cities in Sebastian County, Arkansas
Populated places established in 1884
1884 establishments in Arkansas